Events from the year 1945 in Italy.

Incumbents
King: Victor Emmanuel III
Prime Minister: 
 until 19 June: Ivanoe Bonomi 
 19 June-21 June: vacant
 21 June-8 December: Ferruccio Parri
 8 December-10 December: Alcide De Gasperi

Events
April 6-May 2 - Spring 1945 offensive in Italy
April 12–19 - Battle of the Argenta Gap
April 9–21 - Battle of Bologna
April 26–29 - Battle of Collecchio

Births

Deaths
February 23 - Serafino Mazzolini
April 28 - Benito Mussolini, Clara Petacci, Nicola Bombacci, Alessandro Pavolini and Fernando Mezzasoma
April 29 - Achille Starace
July 10 - Guido Buffarini Guidi
November 19 - Carlo Alberto Biggini

See also
Italian Campaign (World War II)
World War II

References

 
1940s in Italy
Years of the 20th century in Italy